The Face of Britain may refer to:

The Face of Britain (book series), 1930s–1950s topographical book series
The Face of Britain (film), 1935 short documentary by Paul Rotha
Simon Schama's works: 
The Face of Britain: The Nation Through Its Portraits (2015 book) 
The Face of Britain by Simon Schama (2015 TV series)